Califon is a borough in Hunterdon County, in the U.S. state of New Jersey. As of the 2020 United States census, the borough's population was 1,005, a decrease of 71 (−6.6%) from the 2010 census count of 1,076, which in turn reflected an increase of 21 (+2.0%) from the 1,055 counted in the 2000 census.

 Alternatively, the name was related to a bright yellow cattle feed sold during the Gold Rush.

History

Califon was a station on the High Bridge Branch of the Central Railroad of New Jersey. The station was built in 1875 and is now used as a museum by the Califon Historical Society. The rail line was abandoned in 1976 and now serves as a Hunterdon County-administered rail trail called Columbia Trail, which runs south to High Bridge and north to points in Morris County.

Though the mills were present in the area of Califon for some time prior to its incorporation as a town, it was quite a while before growth became evident in the mid-nineteenth century. The J. K. Apgar Farmhouse, listed on the National Register of Historic Places, exemplifies the early stone farmhouses constructed in the region in the late eighteenth and early nineteenth century. The area that would become Califon was first called California, from Jacob Neighbor's enthusiasm in the milling business about the time the California Gold Rush broke out. The Borough was incorporated by an act of the New Jersey Legislature from portions of both Lebanon and Tewksbury Townships on April 2, 1918.

Local legend has it that California became a regular stop for weekend excursion trains through the countryside. When riders bought their tickets they were issued a voucher good for an ice cream; the train would stop so tourists could wander around and cash in their ice cream coupons. Anxious to exploit this source of outside revenue, residents petitioned the railroad to let them build a real station, which they did as a community project. Citing the local account again, two sign painters who came to letter the sign rode the train from Dunellen, but the background paint wasn't dry when they arrived. They sat and drank at the hotel, which later burned down. By the time the sign was ready for their artistic touch, the local tale says, "Califon" was as close to California as the inebriated painters could manage.

Califon is situated just north of the Ken Lockwood Gorge on the South Branch of the Raritan River; this pristine stretch of clear water and forest is a well-known treasure for New Jersey trout fishermen. It is regularly restocked by the state fisheries service. 

The center of Califon is the historic iron bridge spanning the South Branch of the Raritan River, which divides the borough. Recently the State of New Jersey announced that the bridge would be replaced because a loaded school bus represented more weight than the aging bridge could safely carry. Incensed citizens objected, protective of the landmark, and found a colorful but simple solution; the school bus stops at one end of the bridge unloading the students, who then walk across to the other side. Then the empty bus, within imposed weight limits, drives across and the students get back on the bus to continue their ride. Thus the bridge was saved. (Account featured on Califon website).

The 1943 short story, "The Greatest Gift," was set in a town inspired by Califon and adapted into the 1946 classic film It's a Wonderful Life. Author Philip Van Doren Stern said in a 1946 interview, "Incidentally, the movie takes place in Westchester County.  Actually, the town I had in mind was Califon, N.J."  The historic iron bridge in Califon is similar to the bridge that George Bailey considered jumping from in the movie.

Califon became a regional household name when frequently mentioned by Merv Griffin on his TV show during the 1970s. He and his wife Juliette owned a home in nearby Lebanon Township, which had a Califon mailing address, and, while they were married, they were often seen visiting the village in a fringed-top Bermuda-style resort cart, though they lived over 2 miles away. Califon Productions created all of his television ventures.

Hoffman's Crossing was named for Issac Hoffman, who farmed land that lies just south of Califon Bridge, along present day County Route 513.

Historic district

The Califon Historic District is a  historic district encompassing much of the borough. It was added to the National Register of Historic Places on October 14, 1976, for its significance in commerce. The district includes 154 contributing buildings, three contributing structures, and one contributing site. It was created through the efforts of the Califon Historical Society. Califon is a Victorian-style enclave where the houses are marked with the names of the builders and their dates of establishment rather than with street numbers.

The Joseph Tiger House was built of stone in 1846. A stone raceway runs under the former Beatty's Store, indicating a possible mill site. The mid-19th century house at 1 First Street features a gable roof with an intersecting dormer. The Califon Main Street Bridge is a Pratt thru truss design built in 1887 by I. P. Bartley & Co. of Morris County.

Geography
According to the United States Census Bureau, the borough had a total area of 0.98 square miles (2.54 km2), including 0.96 square miles (2.48 km2) of land and 0.02 square miles (0.05 km2) of water (2.04%).

Califon borders the Hunterdon County municipalities of Lebanon Township and Tewksbury Township.

Lower Valley is an unincorporated community located along the border of Califon and Lebanon Township.

Demographics

2010 census

The Census Bureau's 2006–2010 American Community Survey showed that (in 2010 inflation-adjusted dollars) median household income was $108,375 (with a margin of error of +/− $9,026) and the median family income was $110,365 (+/− $5,782). Males had a median income of $95,536 (+/− $13,555) versus $73,958 (+/− $14,845) for females. The per capita income for the borough was $42,975 (+/− $5,250). About 1.7% of families and 2.4% of the population were below the poverty line, including 0.8% of those under age 18 and none of those age 65 or over.

2000 census
As of the 2000 United States census there were 1,055 people, 401 households, and 301 families residing in the borough. The population density was 1,093.2 people per square mile (419.9/km2). There were 410 housing units at an average density of 424.9 per square mile (163.2/km2). The racial makeup of the borough was 98.67% White, 0.76% Asian, and 0.57% from two or more races. Hispanic or Latino of any race were 0.47% of the population.

There were 401 households, out of which 36.7% had children under the age of 18 living with them, 68.8% were married couples living together, 4.5% had a female householder with no husband present, and 24.7% were non-families. 21.2% of all households were made up of individuals, and 8.7% had someone living alone who was 65 years of age or older. The average household size was 2.63 and the average family size was 3.11.

In the borough the population was spread out, with 26.8% under the age of 18, 4.1% from 18 to 24, 30.6% from 25 to 44, 27.9% from 45 to 64, and 10.6% who were 65 years of age or older. The median age was 39 years. For every 100 females, there were 91.5 males. For every 100 females age 18 and over, there were 90.1 males.

The median income for a household in the borough was $76,657, and the median income for a family was $85,963. Males had a median income of $59,167 versus $41,125 for females. The per capita income for the borough was $31,064. About 3.3% of families and 4.3% of the population were below the poverty line, including 2.5% of those under age 18 and 14.8% of those age 65 or over.

Parks and recreation
Califon hosts part of a rail trail that was created out of the former Central Railroad of New Jersey High Bridge Branch. The trail is maintained by Hunterdon County Parks and Recreation and is called the Columbia Trail, which includes a scenic area known as the Ken Lockwood Gorge.

Government

Local government
Califon is governed under the Borough form of New Jersey municipal government, which is used in 218 municipalities (of the 564) statewide, making it the most common form of government in New Jersey. The governing body is comprised of a Mayor and a Borough Council, with all positions elected at-large on a partisan basis as part of the November general election. A Mayor is elected directly by the voters to a four-year term of office. The Borough Council is comprised of six members elected to serve three-year terms on a staggered basis, with two seats coming up for election each year in a three-year cycle. The Borough form of government used by Califon is a "weak mayor / strong council" government in which council members act as the legislative body with the mayor presiding at meetings and voting only in the event of a tie. The mayor can veto ordinances subject to an override by a two-thirds majority vote of the council. The mayor makes committee and liaison assignments for council members, and most appointments are made by the mayor with the advice and consent of the council.

, the Mayor of Califon Borough is Democrat Charles Daniel, whose term of office ends December 31, 2022. Members of the Califon Borough Council are Council President Michael P. Medea (D, 2024), Richard Baggstrom (R, 2023), John Collins (D, 2022), Ed Haversang (R, 2023), Leo M. Janas (D, 2024) and Cathy Smith (D, 2022).

Police coverage in the borough is provided by the Washington Township (Morris County) Police Department under the terms of a shared services agreement between the two municipalities.

Federal, state and county representation
Califon is located in the 7th Congressional District and is part of New Jersey's 23rd state legislative district. Prior to the 2011 reapportionment following the 2010 Census, Califon had been in the 24th state legislative district.

Politics
As of March 2011, there were a total of 723 registered voters in Califon, of which 214 (29.6%) were registered as Democrats, 252 (34.9%) were registered as Republicans and 257 (35.5%) were registered as Unaffiliated. There were no voters registered to other parties.

In the 2012 presidential election, Democrat Barack Obama received 51.0% of the vote (290 cast), ahead of Republican Mitt Romney with 47.3% (269 votes), and other candidates with 1.8% (10 votes), among the 573 ballots cast by the borough's 773 registered voters (4 ballots were spoiled), for a turnout of 74.1%. In the 2008 presidential election, Democrat Barack Obama received 51.1% of the vote (324 cast), ahead of Republican John McCain with 46.4% (294 votes) and other candidates with 1.7% (11 votes), among the 634 ballots cast by the borough's 792 registered voters, for a turnout of 80.1%. In the 2004 presidential election, Republican George W. Bush received 51.2% of the vote (330 ballots cast), outpolling Democrat John Kerry with 47.2% (304 votes) and other candidates with 1.3% (10 votes), among the 644 ballots cast by the borough's 796 registered voters, for a turnout percentage of 80.9.

In the 2013 gubernatorial election, Republican Chris Christie received 62.4% of the vote (237 cast), ahead of Democrat Barbara Buono with 35.3% (134 votes), and other candidates with 2.4% (9 votes), among the 383 ballots cast by the borough's 774 registered voters (3 ballots were spoiled), for a turnout of 49.5%. In the 2009 gubernatorial election, Republican Chris Christie received 55.4% of the vote (251 ballots cast), ahead of  Democrat Jon Corzine with 30.5% (138 votes), Independent Chris Daggett with 12.1% (55 votes) and other candidates with 0.9% (4 votes), among the 453 ballots cast by the borough's 772 registered voters, yielding a 58.7% turnout.

Education
The Califon School District serves students in public school for pre-kindergarten through eighth grade at Califon Public School. As of the 2020–21 school year, the district, comprised of one school, had an enrollment of 91 students and 15.9 classroom teachers (on an FTE basis), for a student–teacher ratio of 5.7:1. In the 2016–2017 school year, Califon had the seventh-smallest enrollment of any school district in the state.

Public school students in ninth through twelfth grades attend Voorhees High School, which also serves students from Glen Gardner, Hampton, High Bridge, Lebanon Township and Tewksbury Township. As of the 2020–21 school year, the high school had an enrollment of 991 students and 76.4 classroom teachers (on an FTE basis), for a student–teacher ratio of 13.0:1. The school is part of the North Hunterdon-Voorhees Regional High School District, which also includes students from Bethlehem Township, Clinton Town, Clinton Township, Franklin Township, Lebanon Borough and Union Township who attend North Hunterdon High School in Annandale.

Eighth grade students from all of Hunterdon County are eligible to apply to attend the high school programs offered by the Hunterdon County Vocational School District, a county-wide vocational school district that offers career and technical education at its campuses in Raritan Township and at programs sited at local high schools, with tuition covered by local taxes.

Places of worship
The Califon United Methodist Church was founded in 1867, but the oldest part of the building was built in 1824 at Oldwick and moved here. The newer sanctuary facing River Road was built in 1891. The Lower Valley Presbyterian Church was built in 1871. Both are noted by the Califon Historical Society.

Transportation

The most prominent roads passing through Califon are County Route 512 and 513.

Notable people

People who were born in, residents of, or otherwise closely associated with Califon include:

 Thomas W. Greelish (1939–1991), United States Attorney for the District of New Jersey from 1985 to 1987. Greelish moved to Califon with his family when he was seven years old
 Merv Griffin (1925–2007), television producer, once owned a farm a few miles outside of Califon. When he created the game show Wheel of Fortune, he gave a nod to Califon when naming the show's production company.  To this day, Califon Productions, Inc. is the copyright holder for all episodes of Wheel of Fortune to date, although the show is owned by Sony Pictures Television
 Francis Burton Harrison (1873–1957), member of the United States House of Representatives and Governor-General of the Philippines under Woodrow Wilson who retired to Califon a few months before his death in 1957
 Teddy Schneider (born 1988), soccer player for the New York Red Bulls

References

External links

 
 Califon Historical Society website
 

 
1918 establishments in New Jersey
Borough form of New Jersey government
Boroughs in Hunterdon County, New Jersey
Populated places established in 1918